Jeff Silbar is a songwriter. Silbar, a native of Los Angeles, won the Grammy Award for Song of the Year in 1990 for co-writing Bette Midler's "Wind Beneath My Wings" with Larry Henley.

Notable compositions
"All My Life" (Kenny Rogers)
"He's a Heartache (Looking for a Place to Happen)" (Janie Fricke)
"I Know What I've Got" (J.C. Crowley)
"Then Again" (Alabama)
"Tie Our Love (In a Double Knot)" (Dolly Parton)
"Til I Loved You" (Restless Heart)
"Where Were You When I Was Falling in Love" (Lobo)
"Wind Beneath My Wings" (Roger Whittaker, Colleen Hewett, Sheena Easton, Lou Rawls, Gladys Knight & The Pips, Gary Morris, Bette Midler, et al.)
"You've Got a Good Love Comin'" (Lee Greenwood)

References

External links

Grammy Award winners
Living people
Year of birth missing (living people)
Songwriters from California
Musicians from Los Angeles